New Auckland is an urban locality in Gladstone in the Gladstone Region, Queensland, Australia. It is on the outskirts of the Gladstone urban area, but, as at December 2020, is experiencing high levels of suburban development.

Geography 
New Auckland is bounded to the north by the Dawson Highway and to the south by Kirkwood Road. It is bounded to the east by Auckland Creek and to the west by Briffney Creek. The land use is suburban residential. The Moura railway line passes through the north-east corner of the suburb.

History 
This suburb was named in December 1988, taking its name from the housing estate name, which takes its name from Auckland Creek, which takes its name in turn from the ship Lord Auckland. The ship was a barque of 516 gross tons, chartered by the New South Wales Government which carried some of the settlers to the first settlement of Gladstone site, which stranded on a shoal entering Gladstone Harbour on 25 January 1847.

In the 2011 census, New Auckland had a population of 4,711 people.

The  revealed that the population of New Auckland had risen to 5,266 people.

Education 
There are no schools in New Auckland. The nearest government primary schools are Clinton State School in neighbouring Clinton to the west and Kin Kora State School  in neighbouring Kin Kora to the north-east. The nearest government secondary schools are Gladstone State High School in West Gladstone to the north-east and Toolooa State High School in Toolooa to the east.

References

Further reading 
 

Gladstone Region
Localities in Queensland